[MARS] Melbourne Art Rooms is a contemporary commercial art gallery in Melbourne, Victoria, Australia. MARS specialises in exhibiting, promoting and building the careers of contemporary Australian and International artists.

History
[MARS] was established by gallerist Andy Dinan in 2004, who converted a former dairy in Port Melbourne into a two-level contemporary gallery. In 2014, [MARS] relocated to a new purpose-built gallery at 7 James St,  Windsor, (in the City of Stonnington).

MARS specialises in exhibiting, promoting and building the careers of contemporary Australian artists. The gallery has participated in a number of national art fairs including Melbourne Art Fair, Spring 1883 and Sydney Contemporary. MARS also exhibits in international art fairs including Photo Basel, Art Central Hong Kong and Volta Basel.

Building
[MARS] is at the forefront of innovation in Australian contemporary art galleries in both design and programs. The architecture and fit-out of MARS is by JAM Architects in collaboration with gallerist and MARS founder Andy Dinan. The three-level space incorporates amenities for showing new media such as sound sculpture, video and light art. The gallery has four distinct exhibition spaces, including a custom black-box gallery committed to the exhibition of contemporary video art, a light-box room for the display of light and sound works, a drawing room to exhibit works on paper as well as a rooftop sculpture garden accessible by an elevator with a light artwork installed into the elevator shaft by artist Jason Sims.

MARS’ architecture also expresses environmental sustainable design excellence in art gallery design. Green qualities contributing to the gallery’s 7 star environmental rating include: thermal mass; double glazing; sustainable materials that improve air quality; smart meters that monitor energy and water use; photovoltaics for electricity generation; rainwater harvesting; energy efficient water fittings and fixtures and recycled timber floors.

Established in 2004 in an iconic dairy in Port Melbourne, MARS’ move to a purpose-built, state-of-the-art building at 7 James Street in Windsor in July 2014 marked the gallery’s 10-year anniversary, launch of new programs and a new chapter.

Artists
MARS represents the careers of emerging to mid-career, contemporary artists; Daniel Agdag, Atong Atem, Penelope Davis, Simon Finn, Stephen Haley, Sophia Whitney Hewson, Bronwyn Kidd, Jenna Lee, Tony Lloyd, Dani McKenzie, Nasim Nasr, Kenny Pittock, Diego Ramirez, Cameron Robbins, Steven Rhall, Damien Shen, Jason Sims, Meagan Streader, Scotty So, Brie Trenerry, and Tricky Walsh.

MARS works with associate artists including Giles Alexander, Fabrice Bigot, Domenico de Clario, Eliza Gosse, Julie Irving, Kristin McIver, Camilla Tadich, Jud Wimhurst and Jilamara Arts and Crafts Association.

Public art and rental art
In addition to a regular exhibition program, [MARS] offers a public art consultancy and works alongside artists, property developers, architects and local councils to implement Public Art projects throughout Melbourne, under the title Andy Dinan Art Consulting (ADA Consulting). 

Consulting and working from [MARS] Gallery HQ in Windsor, ADA Consulting have successfully implemented thought provoking, inspiring art into the public realm, adding to the cultural fabric of each community. Recent public art projects include the Level Crossings Removal Project, East Brunswick Village and 330 Collins refurbishment with AMP Capital. Some of the public art commissions curated by ADA Consulting are featured on the following buildings in Melbourne: 50 Albert Rd, Albert Park with artists Emma Davies, Jeremy Kibel and James Hullick; Eden and Haven residential developments with artwork by artists Priscilla Bracks, Daniel Agdag and Alexis Beckett; Smith Street  Collingwood (The Smith Street Portrait Project by photographer Jacqueline Mitelman), the Domenico De Clario Project and installation by David Burrows; Footscray Plaza redevelopment featuring a 240-square-metre artwork by Melbourne Artist Matthew Harding on the façade of No.18 Albert; Port Melbourne and Melbourne CBD.

[MARS] also offers a rental art program, which seeks to support contemporary artists, through the acquisition and placement of artworks in private and public spaces.

International art fairs
MARS Gallery has participated in three consecutive years at Art Central Hong Kong (2017-2019). In 2022 and 2018 the gallery was invited to Photo Basel, Basel and Volta 14, Basel where MARS was the only Australian gallery to exhibit at the art fair. MARS also exhibited at Art Fair Tokyo (2016) and Korean International Art Fair (2012).

MARS regularly participates in Australian art shows like Sydney Contemporary, and Spring 1883.

References

External links
 

Art museums and galleries in Melbourne